Gaetano "Gai" Mattiolo (born 23 December 1968) is an Italian fashion designer.

Biography 
Born in  Rome, an autodidact, after graduating from the liceo scientifico Mattiolo opened his fashion house in 1987 and the same year he had his breakout presenting his first ready-to-wear collection at the MODIT event in Milan. 

His style is characterised by bright colours and attention to detail, especially buttons, often made of jewellery, which have become his trademark. He was often referred to as a "new Versace" or a Versace heir. He dressed many celebrities, including Queen Sofia of Spain,  Lauren Bacall, Susan Sarandon, Halle Berry, Cher, Ivana Trump, Mariah Carey, Ursula Andress, Sharon Stone and Raffaella Carrà.

In December 2008 he was put under house arrest on charges of fraudolent bankruptcy, being later acquitted.

References

External links 
  

1968 births
Living people 
Italian fashion designers
Fashion designers from Rome